Aarohi Patel is an Indian actress who acts in Gujarati films. After making her acting debut as a child artist in Saandeep Patel's Moti Na Chowk Re Sapna Ma Ditha, she played her first leading role in Vijaygiri Bava's drama film Premji: Rise of a Warrior, which won 10 prominent Gujarat State Awards, including for Best Film. She is known for her roles in the films Love Ni Bhavai and Chaal Jeevi Laiye. She also bagged the 'Best Actress' Award at the 17th Annual Transmedia Gujarati Screen and Stage Awards-2017 and at Radio City Cine Awards-2017 for Love Ni Bhavai.

In 2019, she appeared in Montu Ni Bittu, also directed by Vijaygiri Bava, for which she received GIFA award of 2019 in Best Actress category.

Personal life
Aarohi was born to Gujarat's Director-Producer duo Saandeep Patel and Aarti Patel. She also has a younger sister, Sanjanaa Patel. She completed her Bachelors in Commerce, with specialization in Accounts from H.L. Institute of Commerce, Ahmedabad University. Along with her bachelor studies, she did an internship at one of the Ahmedabad's popular radio stations 94.3 My FM from April 2012 till January 2014. She also did a two-month internship at TV9 Gujarati from April 2014 to June 2014. She has won many college-level competitions in dance and theater. She got her first lead role in Premji: Rise of a Warrior while she was still in college. She did her post graduation in Development Communication from Gujarat University.

Television

Filmography

Web series
Patel has acted in the following web series:

References

External links 
 
 
 

Living people
Actresses in Gujarati cinema
Year of birth missing (living people)